Shattered Soul (Turkish title: Beyza'nın Kadınları which means "Beyza's Women") is a 2006 Turkish crime-thriller film starring Demet Evgar, Tamer Karadağlı and Levent Üzümcü, and directed by Mustafa Altıoklar.

Plot 
Seemingly content with the way her life goes, and deeply in love with her psychiatrist husband Doruk, Beyza is thrown off-balance by strange, occasional memory blackouts. Meanwhile, a number of mutilated legs found around Istanbul push the city into the terror of a serial murderer. Police Lieutenant Fatih investigates the gruesome murders with his new expert partner, Doruk. As the police follow the trail of the murderer, Beyza faces the truth about herself: a relationship, which even she cannot explain, exists between herself and the victims.

Cast 
Demet Evgar as Beyza Türker
Tamer Karadağlı as Fatih
Levent Üzümcü as Doruk Türker
Arda Kural as Naim
Engin Hepileri as Hüseyin
Mine Cayiroglu as Serap
Berrak Tüzünataç as Figen
Elif Dağdeviren as Doctor
Damla Basak as Elif
Engin Altan as Koray

References

2006 films
Films set in Turkey
2000s Turkish-language films
2006 crime thriller films
Turkish crime thriller films